Paul Beauchamp "Billy" Williams (August 8, 1892 – July 14, 1973) was an American football, basketball, and baseball coach and college athletics administrator.  He served as the head football coach at Muncie State Normal School—now known as Ball State University from 1924 to 1925, compiling a record of 3–8. He was the  Ball Teachers College's head basketball from 1922 to 1925, tallying a mark of 36–34–1, and the school's head baseball coach from 1922 to 1926 and from 1928 to 1958, amassing a record of 207–228–4.  In addition, Williams served as the school's athletic director from 1921 until 1958.  He died on July 14, 1973, at a nursing home in Muncie, Indiana.

Head coaching record

Football

References

External links
 

1892 births
1973 deaths
American men's basketball players
Ball State Cardinals athletic directors
Ball State Cardinals baseball coaches
Ball State Cardinals football coaches
Ball State Cardinals men's basketball coaches
Basketball coaches from Indiana
Indiana State Sycamores baseball players
Indiana State Sycamores men's basketball players
People from Sullivan County, Indiana